Davara caricae, the papaya webworm moth, is a species of snout moth in the genus Davara. It was described by Harrison Gray Dyar Jr. in 1913, and is known from Panama, Puerto Rico and Florida.

References

Moths described in 1913
Phycitinae